was a town located in Tsuna District, Hyōgo Prefecture, Japan.

As of 2003, the town had an estimated population of 8,769 and a density of 359.09 persons per km2. The total area was 24.42 km2.

On April 1, 2005, Higashiura, along with the towns of Awaji, Hokudan, Ichinomiya and Tsuna (all from Tsuna District), was merged to create the city of Awaji and no longer exists as an independent municipality.

Dissolved municipalities of Hyōgo Prefecture
Awaji, Hyōgo